The Pachaug River is a  river arising from the Pachaug State Forest at the Connecticut - Rhode Island border and draining into the Quinebaug River. It is crossed by the Ashland Mill Bridge in Griswold, Connecticut, a bridge which is listed on the U.S. National Register of Historic Places.

Hopeville Pond 

Hopeville Pond is a three-mile impoundment and widening of the Pachaug River in Hopeville Pond State Park in the "lost" village of Hopeville in the town of Griswold (much of the village was flooded by the creation of Hopeville Pond by a dam built to generate electricity).  It has a public beach, kayak/canoe boat launch as well as camping and picnic facilities.

Other Impoundments 
Ashland Pond in the borough of Jewett City is another impoundment of the Pachaug River, one closer to the merger with the Quinebaug River.

Glasgo Pond, Doaneville Pond and Pachaug Pond are additional impoundments of the Pachaug River in the villages of Glasgo, Doaneville and Pachaug in the town of Griswold, Connecticut.

Sawmill Pond and Beachdale Pond are additional impoundments of the river in the town of Voluntown, Connecticut.

The source of the Pachaug River is a small "stream-like" section in Exeter, Rhode Island north of and draining into Beach Pond, a large impoundment split between Voluntown, Connecticut and Exeter, Rhode Island.

History 
The Pachaug River was used by the Mohegan Indians, who constructed stone weirs to direct the water flow and funnel fish to the center of the stream for trapping.

In 1974 and 1977, a fishing advisory said it was in good to excellent fishing location.

In the 1970s, a plan was drawn up to pump 7.5 million gallons of water a day from the river into the Rattlesnack Brook, which in turn would feed the Broad Brook.

See also
List of rivers of Connecticut
List of rivers of Rhode Island

References

Rivers of New London County, Connecticut
Connecticut placenames of Native American origin
Griswold, Connecticut
Rivers of Connecticut
Rivers of Rhode Island
Tributaries of the Thames River (Connecticut)